Khulʿ, also called khula, is a procedure through which a woman can give a divorce to her husband in Islam, by returning the dower (mahr) or something else that she received from her husband or without returning anything, as agreed by the spouses or Qadi’s (court) decree depending on the circumstances. Based on traditional fiqh, and referenced in the Qur'an and hadith, khul' allows a woman to initiate a divorce. In terms, breaking the marriage relationship with the wife's willingness to pay iwald (compensation) to the owner of the contract, namely the husband.

Origins in texts

Qur'an
From the "Sahih International" translation of the Qur'an.

Divorce is twice. Then, either keep [her] in an acceptable manner or release [her] with good treatment. And it is not lawful for you to take anything of what you have given them unless both fear that they will not be able to keep [within] the limits of Allah. But if you fear that they will not keep [within] the limits of Allah, then there is no blame upon either of them concerning that by which she ransoms herself. These are the limits of Allah, so do not transgress them. And whoever transgresses the limits of Allah—it is those who are the wrongdoers.
— 2:229

And if a woman fears from her husband contempt or evasion, there is no sin upon them if they make terms of settlement between them—and settlement is best. And present in [human] souls is stinginess. But if you do good and fear Allah—then indeed Allah is ever Acquainted, with what you do.
— 4:128

Hadith
The most well known story that references khul' and serves as the basis for legal interpretations is the story of Jamilah, the wife of Thabit ibn Qays:

Narrated Ibn 'Abbas: The wife of Thabit bin Qais came to the Prophet and said, "O Allah's Apostle! I do not blame Thabit for defects in his character or his religion, but I, being a Muslim, dislike to behave in un-Islamic manner if I remain with him." On that Allah's Apostle said to her, "Will you give back the garden which your husband has given you as Mahr?" She said, "Yes." Then the Prophet ordered to Thabit, "O Thabit! Accept your garden, and divorce her once."

Related issues

Compensation
Most Islamic schools of law agree that the husband is not entitled to more than the initial amount of dower (mahr) given to the wife.  However, some interpretations suggest that the husband is entitled a greater compensation, while other interpretations suggest that the husband is not entitled to any compensation.  According to some interpretations, khulʿ demands that the mahr already paid be returned along with any wedding gifts.  According 
to majority of imams of fiqh this law only to apply if there is no fault on the husband. Men sometimes prefer and pressure their wives to demand a khulʿ instead of the husband pronouncing a talaq so that the husband can demand the return of the mahr. Another scenario that rarely arises in khulʿ is that the husband will request an unreasonable financial compensation. This can effectively constrain her from seeking khulʿ because they have no means to support themselves financially with the loss of their mahr and other wedding “gifts.”

Consent of the husband
In regard to the consent of the husband, most schools agree that husband's agreement is a basic procedure and essential to the granting of divorce, unless extenuating circumstances apply, while only few schools allow the judge to give a no fault divorce without husband's consent if she gives up mahr.  For a fault based divorce the husband does not have to consent if the grounds of divorce are valid, such as cruelty (darar) or impotence (if undisclosed to bride at time of marriage).  In addition, if a husband cannot provide his wife with basic marital obligations, such as shelter or maintenance, a woman may be granted khulʿ.  If the woman is underage, then consent must be given from the guardian of her property.  The details of laws of khulʿ in particular cannot be found in the Qur'an directly, so a Sharia court judge must discern from Hadith and Islamic jurisprudence historical cases what they believe to be valid reasons for divorce.

Role of the Court
Views on role of the court and judge varies across schools, depending on whether or not the divorce is considered a type of talaq (husband's repudiation of the marriage) or judicial annulment.  If the husband does not consent to the divorce, a woman often goes to a mediating third party, such as an imam.  Only a person versed in Islamic law i.e. a qadi, or Islamic Sharia court judge, can grant the khulʿ without the husband's consent. When petition for khulʿ is taken to the Sharia courts, a judge is permitted to substitute the husband and annul the marriage.  This process of judicial annulment is also commonly referred to as faskh, which typically occurs when the husband refuses to consent to the wife's decision to divorce.

Iddah
When a woman is granted a divorce through khulʿ, she must enter a waiting period known as iddah. According to the majority opinion, which includes the reliable position in the Hanafi, Maliki, Shafi'i and Hanbali schools, the waiting period for khul' is the same as the waiting period for divorce, and a minority opinion limits it to a single period. If a woman has already gone through menopause, she must wait three calendar months.  The waiting period for a woman who has irregular periods is dependent on different interpretations.  If a woman is pregnant or becomes pregnant during the waiting period, she must observe the waiting period until laying her burden.

Custody
Custody over children tends to favor the mother if she has not remarried, but the father is still obligated to provide childcare. Once a child is old enough(7 for male,9 for female), he or she is given the choice to decide who has custody according to shafii, or custody is automatically given to the father according to hanbali school or custody is given to mother according to Maliki school.

Interpretations by region

Egypt
A form of khulʿ was adopted by Egypt in 2000, allowing a Muslim woman to divorce her husband without any fault. The law is so strict that only 126 women out of 5,000 women who applied for khul were actually granted. As a condition of the divorce, the woman renounces any financial claim on the husband and any entitlement to the matrimonial home. The Islamic khulʿ procedure has also been used by some Egyptian Christian women to obtain a no-fault divorce, and it is considered by some as an opportunity for their empowerment vis-à-vis patriarchical institutions.

Iraq
Iraq is unique in that it is stated in the law that infidelity constitutes as a valid reason for divorce.  In addition, a woman is allowed to seek khul' if her husband is infertile and they do not have children.  When a woman is granted khulʿ, compensation can be greater or less than the dower(if husband is not at fault).

Jordan, Morocco, and Syria
In Morocco, if a woman is coerced or harassed by her husband, the husband has no entitlement to compensation.  In Morocco and Syria, compensation other than money can include child care or custody.  In Jordan, a new law has been recently passed that allows a woman to end her marriage by using the principle of khulʿ itself if she returns her dower. Earlier it was only given on certain grounds.  Within the first two years of passing this law, the courts saw an exponential increase in khulʿ lawsuits. The law has yet to be approved by parliament, however, and it is still condemned by many lawyers to this day.

Nigeria
Khulʿ is the most common form of divorce in Northern Nigeria.  If a woman can provide enough compensation on her own or with the help of family, it is likely that she will be able to get out of an unhappy marriage.

North America
According to a ten-year study from 1992 to 2002 conducted by Dr Ilyas Ba-Yunus, the overall divorce rate amongst Muslims in North America was at 32% which was significantly lower than the 51% rate for the general population. Further, In North America, a 2009 a study conducted for SoundVision, an Islamic foundation, concluded that 64% of Islamic divorces are initiated by women. Imams in North America have adopted multiple approaches towards Khulʿ. One of the biggest issues that cause imams to differ in their views is whether or not the women should return the mahr to the husband. Another important issue for women in North America is getting both a civil decree and religious divorce. Religious divorce is sought out as "a meaningful personal and spiritual process" that is attained in addition to (not as a substitute) to a civil decree. Another important issue that arises in North America is that many women are unaware of their Islamic right to seek khulʿ. Some North American women even caution that being assertive and knowledgeable of Islamic law in front of their imam may even be detrimental to them. Women have said that the imams appeared to be "less sympathetic" because they saw the women as challengers to their authority.

Pakistan
According to the "Dissolution of Muslim Marriage Act" passed in 1939, judicial Khula was allowed to be authorized without the husband's consent later it was extended to include no fault divorce if the wife was agreed to forfeit her financial rights. Marriage is not considered a sacrament among Muslims but rather a civil contract with "spiritual and moral" undertones. Therefore, legally, the marriage can be dissolved for "good cause." The wife has the right to have the marriage dissolved based on the law of Khula if she decides she cannot live with her husband. In Pakistan there are two different classes of Khula. The first (i) is by mutual agreement; and the (ii) By order of the court Qadi and dissolution of marriage taking place by the husband's pronouncing talaq in the first class of cases and by the order of the Qadi or the court in the second class of cases. The Qur'an declares “Women have rights against men similar to those them."' The wife alone wishes to divorce her husband; and there are two ways for her to achieve this divorce or 'khula' (i) She requests her husband that she no longer wishes to remain in marriage with him; and the husband declares a divorce upon her. (ii) If her husband is not willing to grant her a divorce, the wife is well within her rights in Shariah to approach a Shariah Court and present her divorce case to the Shariah Judge. The Judge would then summon the husband and ask him to declare a divorce upon his wife and free her from the marriage. If the husband for any reason refuses, the Sharia Judge has the right to declare a divorce between the husband and the wife in marriage.

Saudi Arabia
In Saudi Arabia Women awarded khulʿ in Saudi Arabia are required to financially compensate their husbands or give away marriage settlements unless the husband has harmed her. Sometimes, this may include custody rights to their children. Other than the dowry, it is also common for the wife, especially in the case of newlyweds, to return marriage expenses. Older females in Saudi Arabia generally do not support khulʿ. They believe that the increased number of khulʿ requests is the result of Western influences of Saudi culture. Mainly, the new belief that women should also pursue financial aspirations. In Saudi Arabia, women can end up losing when awarded khulʿ. This is because often they cannot support themselves.

Yemen
In Yemen, khulʿ is recognized as a judicially supervised annulment.  Alcoholism, jail time of more than three years, impotence, mental feebleness, and hatred constitute as valid reasons for a woman to seek khulʿ.  While domestic violence is not always constituted as valid, it is against the law in Yemen for husbands to physically or psychologically harm their wives.

References

Further reading
 Amanat, Abbas and Frank Griffel (2009).  Shari'a: Islamic Law in the Contemporary Context. Stanford: Stanford University Press.
 Engineer, Asghar Ali (1992). The Rights of Women in Islam. New York: St. Martin's Press.
 Macfarlane, Julie. Islamic Divorce in North America: A Shari'a Path in a Secular Society. Oxford: Oxford University Press, 2012.
 Nasir, Dr. Jamal J. Ahmad (2009).  The Status of Women Under Islamic Law and Modern Islamic Legislation.  Netherlands: Brill. 
 Tucker, Judith E. (2008). Women, Family, and Gender in Islamic Law. Cambridge: Cambridge University Press. 
 Welchman, Lynn (1998). Women and Muslim Family Laws in Arab States: A Comparative Overview of Textual Development and Advocacy. Amsterdam: Amsterdam University Press.

External links
 Pakistan Family Law Firm
 The Law of Divorce (Khula) in Pakistan.
 Yusuf al-Qaradawi. on Khula.
 Kakakhel, Muhibulla Mian. The Law of Divorce in Pakistan. September 23, 2008. 
 Ali & Haseeb Law Associates,  Laws of Pakistan Relating to Marriage, Divorce, Custody and Maintenance
The Law of Divorce (Khula) in Pakistan.
New Khula (Divorce) Law in Punjab Pakistan
 The Hadith Book searchtruth.com
 Hamada, Suad (2010). "The Hard Way Out: Divorce By Khula" March 18, 2010.

Divorce in Islam
Women's rights in Islam
Islamic terminology